Live in Canada 2005: The Dark Secret, released in 2006, is the first live album by the symphonic power metal band Rhapsody. It was recorded on 14 June 2005 at the Métropolis in Montreal, Canada, during the first part of the Demons, Dragons and Warriors World Tour.

It is the last release of the band under the name Rhapsody. They changed their named to Rhapsody of Fire later that year.

Track listing 
Disc 1

Disc 2 – Limited Edition DVD
 Concert in Dolby Digital 5.1 Surround – 60:07
 Preview: Introduction & USA – 1:58
 Preview: Canada – 3:42
 Preview: Europe – 5:14

Personnel 
Credits for Live in Canada 2005: The Dark Secret adapted from liner notes.

Rhapsody of Fire
 Fabio Lione – lead vocals
 Luca Turilli – guitar
 Dominique Leurquin – guitar
 Alex Staropoli – keyboards
 Patrice Guers – bass
 Alex Holzwarth – drums

Additional musician
 Dominique Leurquin – guitar

Production
 Sascha Paeth – production, engineering, mixing
 Dirk Kloiber – recording
 Philip Colodetti – engineering
 Ernst Seider – engineering
 Bob Rager – engineering
 Joey DeMaio – executive producer
 Karsten vom Wege – cover art, layout

Charts

References

External links 
 Editing Live in Canada 2005: The Dark Secret Album Review

Rhapsody of Fire live albums
2006 live albums